John T McDonough (August 15, 1916 – July 10, 1978) was an American football referee. After graduating from Stanford University in 1940, he served as an assistant superintendent of Orange County, CA Schools. McDonough wore number 11 for all 10 years of the AFL's existence, through the NFL merger, retiring in 1974.  His 240 game assignments included Super Bowl IV, in which he performed the coin toss, and the 1971 AFC divisional playoff game between the Dolphins and Chiefs, which is the longest game in NFL history.

After retiring from the field, McDonough served as the head of officials for both years of the World Football League. 

McDonough wrote a book about his experiences. Don't Hit Him, He's Dead was published in 1978.

McDonough died of cancer on July 10, 1978.

References

1978 deaths
National Football League officials
 Stanford University alumni